Markkleeberg is a railway station in Markkleeberg, Saxony, Germany. The station is located on the Leipzig–Hof railway. The train services are operated by Deutsche Bahn. Since December 2013 the station is served by the S-Bahn Mitteldeutschland.

History

The station was opened on 1 July 1889 under the name of  Oetzsch. It has had the following names:

 until 1905: Oetzsch
 until 1924: Ötzsch
 until 1934: Oetzsch
 since 1934: Markkleeberg

After Oetzsch and Markkleeberg had united to form Oetzsch-Markkleeberg in 1915, the station retained the name of Oetzsch. It was only with the formation of the new town of Markkleeberg that it was renamed to Markkleeberg. In 1969, the station was integrated in the Leipzig S-Bahn network, which since 2013 has formed part of the S-Bahn Mitteldeutschland. Since 2013, there have been no platforms on the main line.

Train services
The following services currently call at the station:

References

External links

Railway stations in Markkleeberg
Railway stations in Germany opened in 1889